Mario Reiter (born 23 October 1986) is an Austrian footballer who plays as a midfielder for Union Dietach.

References

External links
 Guardian Football
 
 

1986 births
Living people
Austrian footballers
ASKÖ Pasching players
SK Austria Kärnten players
SC Wiener Neustadt players
SV Ried players
LASK players
SC Schwanenstadt players
FC Juniors OÖ players
Austrian Football Bundesliga players
2. Liga (Austria) players
Regionalliga players
Association football midfielders
People from Steyr
Footballers from Upper Austria